The year 1709 in architecture involved some significant events.

Buildings and structures

Buildings

 In Prague, Hradec Králové, the Bishop's residence, one of the most elaborate baroque buildings in the city, is begun (completed in 1716).
 In Vienna, the Theater am Kärntnertor, designed by Antonio Beduzzi, is built.
 In Nantucket, the Woodbox Inn is built by Captain George Bunker.
 In Nara, Japan, the Tōdai-ji Temple is rebuilt to its current aspect (first built in 709).
 In China, the Chengqi Lou Fujian tulou is built.

Births
 April 25 – Carl Johan Cronstedt, Swedish architect and inventor (died 1779)
 June 4? – Johann Gottfried Rosenberg, German-Danish rococo architect (died 1776)
 Johan Christian Conradi, German-Danish master builder and architect (died 1779)
 Thomas Ivory, English builder and architect working in Norwich (died 1779)
 Approximate date – John Phillips, English master carpenter, builder and architect (died 1775)

Deaths
 August 31 – Andrea Pozzo, Italian Baroque architect, decorator, stage designer, painter and art theoretician (born 1642)

architecture
Years in architecture
18th-century architecture